Vetchi is a rural locality (a village) in Nagornoye Rural Settlement, Petushinsky District, Vladimir Oblast, Russia. The population was 16 as of 2010. There are 15 streets.

Geography 
Vetchi is located on the Kirzhach River, 37 km northwest of Petushki (the district's administrative centre) by road. Krasny Luch is the nearest rural locality.

References 

Rural localities in Petushinsky District